Purple Reign is a mixtape by Future.

It may also refer to:

Books
Purple Reign, biography of musician Prince originally published as Slave to the Rhythm: The Artist Formerly Known as Prince.
Purple Reign, book by Nestor Aparicio

Society
Purple Reign, real life female superhero in Seattle's Rain City Superhero Movement

Sports
The Purple Reign, Gem City Rollergirls
Purple Reign defense strategies, Huskies coach Jim Lambright
Purple Reign, 1985-1986-1987 victories of Marion High School (Indiana) under coach Bill Green with Jay Edwards (basketball)

Music
Purple Reign (funk band), Bobby Beato single "This Old Man" 1975
Purple Reign (girl group), Victoria Monet 
Purple Reign (show), a Prince tribute act

Albums
Purple Reign in Blood, album by Fenix*Tx 2005
Purple Reign - the Synth Plays Prince, tribute album to Prince (musician) 1998
Jon Moskowitz Presents: Purple Reign, mashup tribute by MCs from The Diplomats 2006

See also
Purple Rain (disambiguation)